Drylanders is a 1962 Canadian Western film directed by Don Haldane and Written by M. Charles Cohen and starring Frances Hyland and James B. Douglas. It was the National Film Board of Canada's first English-language feature film and its earliest entry outside of the documentary format.

Plot
Set in 1900s Western Canada, Daniel Greer (James Douglas) returns home after the Boer War to find city life not to his liking. Instead, he opts for the life of a wheat farmer. At first, his farm is prosperous, but he becomes victim to a nationwide drought. He struggles to keep his farm afloat, but dies before he could see the end of the drought. His wife (Frances Hyland) continues her husband's work on the farm.

Cast
 Frances Hyland as Liza 
 James B. Douglas as Dan (as James Douglas)
 Lester Nixon as Bob MacPherson 
 Mary Savidge as Ada MacPherson (as Mary Savage)
 William Fruet as Colin (as William Fruete)
 Don Francks as Russel
 Iréna Mayeska as Thora (as Irena Mayeska)
 Ernest Huber as Man in boxcar

Production
Drylanders was a fictionalized documentary similar to earlier French-language productions from the NFB's Panoramique series and dramas in the English-language Perspective series. Heavily promoted during its release, the film was modestly successful at the box office.

Drylanders came about after a documentary on farming and irrigation in Saskatchewan, suggested by writer Charles Cohen, had been rejected by the Canadian Broadcasting Corporation. Director Donald Haldane then suggested making a fiction film. Cohen wrote a personal story, concentrating on the trials of the "Greer" family, who had come from Montreal to try their luck at farming.

The film was filmed in black and white, in SuperScope: a less expensive alternative to CinemaScope. It was the first time SuperScope had been used at the NFB. Filming began in the summer of 1961, shooting in and around Swift Current, Saskatchewan. Several stage actors from Toronto were brought in for the principal roles, including Hyland and Douglas. Local actors were signed for some of the smaller supporting roles. Filming on the Prairies took several weeks. A key blizzard scene was shot in winter of 1962 at the NFB studio in Montreal. The production budget rose to about $218,000, roughly twice what was planned.

Release
Columbia Pictures distributed the film, premiering Drylanders in Swift Current, then releasing across the Prairies, a couple of towns at a time. The film was also released in British Columbia and Eastern Canada, eventually playing in more than 500 cinemas nationwide.

The film was offered as part of a double feature or accompanied by the NFB documentary Fields of Sacrifice. A French-language version, Un autre pays, played across Quebec. The film was released theatrically in the United Kingdom, United States and Central and South America. It would also play on television in Switzerland, Yugoslavia, China and Malaysia, among other countries.

It played theatrically throughout 1963 and 1964 before making its way to the non-theatrical circuit, where it was shown in schools and community centres on 16 mm. It later enjoyed a second career on television and home video.

References

Works cited

External links
 
 Watch Drylanders at the National Film Board of Canada Web site
  The New York Times review]

1962 films
National Film Board of Canada films
Canadian drama films
Films set in the 1900s
Fictional farms
Films set in the Canadian Prairies
Columbia Pictures films
Canadian black-and-white films
English-language Canadian films
Films shot in Saskatchewan
Swift Current
Films scored by Eldon Rathburn
Canadian Western (genre) films
Quebec films
1960s English-language films
1960s Canadian films